Marilène Phipps-Kettlewell (born 1950 in Haiti) is a Haitian-American poet, painter, and short story writer.

Life
Marilène Phipps-Kettlewell was born and raised in Haiti, until the age of 10. She also lived in France.  She studied anthropology at the University of California, Berkeley, and graduated from the University of Pennsylvania with an M.F.A.. She has won fellowships from the Guggenheim Foundation, Bunting Institute, W. E. B. Du Bois Institute and the Center for the Study of World Religions, all at Harvard University, as well as from the New England Foundation for the Arts.

Her work has appeared in the literary journals Callaloo, Tanbou, and Ploughshares.
She has donated paintings to the National Center of Afro-American Artists.

Awards
 2000: Crab Orchard Review Poetry Prize
 1999–2000: Senior Fellowship, Center for the Study of World Religions, Harvard Divinity School
 1993: Grolier Poetry Prize
 1995: Guggenheim Fellowship in painting
 Bunting Institute
 Harvard University W. E. B. Du Bois Institute for Afro-American Research

Works

Anthologies

Reviews
Just a handful of poems actually address the earthquake itself—perfectly understandable, given its recentness at the time of the Harvard reading. Among them, 'Intersection' by Danielle Legros Georges, Tom Daley's 'After a Stroke, My Mother Addresses Children in a Photograph of a Sidewalk in Port-au-Prince,' and 'Earthquake' by Marilène Phipps-Kettlewell deserve a special mention, as the most innovative in their imagery and emotional thrust. In 'Earthquake,' we read of the collapse of bodies and buildings, and see vividly the destruction wrought in Port-au-Prince.

Life in Haiti, before the recent earthquake but no less steeped in hardship and spiritual overcoming, is captured in interconnected stories by a gifted Haitian American. ... In sometimes heartbreaking, sometimes sharply ironic fashion, Phipps-Kettlewell writes of coping in a place where the lush surroundings are a constant reminder of how removed from paradise people are. ... But as sad as the stories can get, the author's empathy for her resilient subjects, and her grasp of the human comedy in depicting the creative ways downtrodden people keep hope alive, makes the book unexpectedly entertaining. Brilliantly evocative contemporary stories about Haiti ...

In contrast, one can, and does, find pleasure in Marilene Phipps's first full-length collection of poems, Crossroads and Unholy Water. Not the light, transient pleasure of a novel only suitable for the beach, but pleasure of the soul-satisfying kind. The book invites deeper reading, rather than demanding it. ... Phipps book has the tried and true stuff of fine poetry—remarkable images, striking metaphors, big themes—without being stuffy. It covers the full range of the human drama—its glory, its misery, its humor and its pathos.

... Marilene Phipps focuses on voodoo themes but she paints incongruously in heavy dabs of oily impasto. An example is the somewhat-photographic composition of a man in white clothes paying his respects to the corpse under a sheet before a shelf loaded with statuettes and vases of flowers. The drawing is sound and the colors juicy but the general effect is perilously close to calendar art.

References

External links
 Author's website
 "Hope is an Act of Faith: An Interview With Marilene Phipps", Web del Sol.
 Kathleen M. Balutansky and Marilene Phipps, "Houses of the People and Houses of the Self: An Interview with Marilene Phipps", Callaloo, Vol. 18, No. 2 (Spring 1995), pp. 418–430.
 Marilene's Official Facebook Page

1950 births
21st-century American women writers
American women poets
American writers of Haitian descent
Haitian emigrants to the United States
Living people
University of California, Berkeley alumni
University of Pennsylvania alumni
Writers from Boston